dacadoo is a Zurich-based technology company that combines mobile technologies, social networking, gamification, Artificial Intelligence (AI) and big data analytics with the aim of helping users improve their health and wellbeing.

History and background

dacadoo is based in Zurich, Switzerland and was founded as QUENTIQ AG in 2010 by Peter Ohnemus, a serial Swiss entrepreneur. It was later renamed to dacadoo ag in January 2012. Ohnemus worked since the early days of dacadoo together with Prof. Laurence Jacobs and Andre Naef on the core research and development of the dacadoo Health Score.

dacadoo has client service offices in Boston (USA), Odense (Denmark), Sydney (Australia), Shanghai (China) and Tokyo (Japan). The company is privately funded.

dacadoo's first product, the Digital Health Engagement platform, went live in December 2011. Since then, they have released several updates and major improvements and currently runs on version 4.4.0, titled Wheel of Life™, in over 18 languages across the world.

The company focuses exclusively on a B2B2C go-to-market approach and has signed agreements with customers (insurers, corporate wellness vendors, etc.) who launched the dacadoo platform in an own branded version to their end users in various countries.

The company presupposes its health platform execution on the premise that sedentary lifestyles have increased the proportion of people who are overweight, have diabetes or suffer heart failure in our society thus pressuring further the already stressed healthcare budgets of most developed countries. One such study is the clinical data published in the Edward R. Laskowski, M.D., Mayo Clinic, 2018 publication: «An analysis of 13 studies of sitting time and activity levels found that those who sat for more than eight hours a day with no physical activity had a risk of dying similar to the risks of dying posed by obesity and smoking.» With these type of studies as their reference dacadoo has been, according to their website and press releases, developing the Wheel of Life™ lifestyle navigation platform that calculates a person's Health Score.

The score, a number from 0 to 1,000, is calculated based on over 300 million person-years of clinical data and represents a person's health status from poor to excellent. It aims to represent a directional relative indicator of a user's current health and wellbeing status in real-time. The dacadoo Health Score is based on three main pillars:
 Your Physical Health (who you are): the platform captures hard data such as age, sex, weight, height, body dimensions, blood values and blood pressure
 Your Mental Wellbeing (how you feel): the platform uses a quality of life questionnaire to obtain the necessary information for this pillar
 Your Lifestyle (what you do): the platform captures data from physical activity, nutrition, sleep, self-control and mindfulness

According to their statement, many of the company's initiatives aim to focus on active health promotion (prevention) and healthier lifestyle to tackle the problems before they become chronic – in this instance referencing a report on global life sciences published by Greg Reh in 2020 which recognizes that changing behavioral patterns represented the single biggest opportunity to improve an individual's health outcome.

The company's business model is based on the premise that the combination of smartphone technology, social networking, motivation techniques from the gaming industry (gamification), Artificial Intelligence (AI), big data analytics and a reward system, have the power to facilitate lifestyle behavior change in individuals. As a result, the company trademarked the dacadoo Health Score Platform based on these principles. The company has since launch issued a disclaimer that the so-called dacadoo Health Score is not a medical diagnostic tool but a lifestyle product and therefore does not substitute the diagnosis of a medical professional.

Peter Ohnemus, when founding dacadoo back in 2010, thought that "Relevant, Easy & Fun" (the REF factor) was missing in what he called the "Something for Something" economy.

Products and Functionality 

dacadoo offers a range of products within their value proposition, including:

The dacadoo Digital Health Engagement Platform: Wheel of Life™

The digital and mobile health & wellbeing platform can be accessed by web browser or via the native mobile apps for iPhone (including Apple Watch) and Android smartphones, with an access code. The platform calculates a real-time Health Score for each user based on 3 key areas: Lifestyle (exercise, nutrition, self-control, mindfulness and sleep), Physical Health (biometric measures), and Mental Wellbeing, and motivates users through automated lifestyle coaching, gamification, social features and a reward system.

This product can be fully white labelled, including client's branding and sub-branding.

The platform is device and application agnostic and supports third party devices and apps from companies such as:

 Fitbit
 Garmin
 Polar
 Withings
 Strava
 Apple Health
 Google Fit
 Misfit
 TomTom

In addition to offer the connection to the various tracking devices and apps, dacadoo offers an integrated tracker that can track more than 115 different indoor and outdoor fitness activities.

The dacadoo Risk Engine

The dacadoo risk-based engine uses models backed by clinical research and provides accurate outputs to be used in accelerated underwriting and dynamic pricing or to calculate a Health Score.

 For Accelerated underwriting and dynamic pricing: It offers the user valuable information on mortality & morbidity risks, additionally to imputed data for missing points. This is of key importance to Life & Health Insurers.
 For Health Score solutions: with the main goal to understand and measure health. It provides an accurate score from 0 to 1,000 and it's normalized by age and gender.

The dacadoo API

Allows to build customized applications using dacadoo's award-winning technology as a foundation. It provides full access to dacadoo's technology components via a RESTful Application Programming Interface, the dacadoo API.

Customers have the possibility of using the API to offer a different user experience (UX) and user interface (UI) to dacadoo's white label product.

Awards and Recognitions 
The following is a list of awards and nominations dacadoo has received. Followed by a table of all recognitions.

Media coverage 

The company has received media coverage in print, online, TV and radio all over the world. Following a list of the most prominent media coverage per language.

References

External links 
 www.dacadoo.com
 

Swiss social networking websites
Health websites